Tmesisternus wiedenfeldi is a species of beetle from the family Cerambycidae. The scientific name of this species was first published in 1911 by Per Olof Christopher Aurivillius.

References

wiedenfeldi
Beetles described in 1911